Randers RC is a Danish rugby club in Randers, which plays in the DRU 2nd division west. The Raiders won their division in 2013.

External links
 Randers RC

Danish rugby union teams
Randers